Aizkraukle Municipality is a municipality in Vidzeme, Latvia. The municipality was formed in 2001 by merging town Aizkraukle and Aizkraukle Parish the administrative centre being Aizkraukle. The population in 2020 was 8,024.

As a part of the 2021 Latvian administrative reform, the municipalities of Aizkraukle, Jaunjelgava, Koknese, Nereta, Pļaviņas and Skrīveri were merged into the new Aizkraukle Municipality. The new municipality encompasses nearly all of the area of the former Aizkraukle District, with the omission of Kurmene Parish and Valle Parish.

Subdivisions 

 Aiviekste Parish
 Aizkraukle Parish
 Aizkraukle
 Bebri Parish
 Daudzese Parish
 Irši Parish
 Jaunjelgava Parish
 Jaunjelgava
 Klintaine Parish
 Koknese Parish
 Koknese
 Mazzalve Parish
 Nereta Parish
 Pilskalne Parish
 Pļaviņas
 Sece Parish
 Sērene Parish
 Skrīveri Parish
 Staburags Parish
 Sunākste Parish
 Vietalva Parish
 Zalve Parish

Twin towns – sister cities

Aizkraukle is twinned with:

 Biržai, Lithuania
 Eppstein, Germany
 Kiskunhalas, Hungary
 Slavutych, Ukraine
 Tczew, Poland
 Thale, Germany

Images

See also
Administrative divisions of Latvia

References

 
Municipalities of Latvia